is a Japanese footballer who plays for Omiya Ardija in the J. League.

Club career stats
Updated to 23 February 2018.

Honours
J2 League (1): 2015

References

External links
Profile at Omiya Ardija

1989 births
Living people
Association football people from Saitama Prefecture
Japanese footballers
J1 League players
J2 League players
Omiya Ardija players
Association football defenders
People from Tokorozawa, Saitama